Thompson Farm, also known as the Pierson Farm, is a historic home and farm located in London Britain Township, Chester County, Pennsylvania. It has five contributing buildings.  They are a brick farmhouse, a stone and frame bank barn (c. 1800), frame outhouse, chicken house, and corn crib.  The farmhouse was built in 1833, and expanded in 1857.

It was added to the National Register of Historic Places in 1983.

References

Farms on the National Register of Historic Places in Pennsylvania
Houses completed in 1857
Houses in Chester County, Pennsylvania
National Register of Historic Places in Chester County, Pennsylvania
1857 establishments in Pennsylvania